Henry Sartwell (7 March 1837 - 26 February 1910) was a sergeant in the United States Army who was awarded the Presidential Medal of Honor for gallantry during the American Civil War. Sartwell was awarded the medal on 17 November 1896 for actions performed at the Battle of Chancellorsville in Virginia on 3 May 1863.

Personal life 
Sartwell was born on 7 March 1837 in Ticonderoga, Essex County, New York. He married Esther Fish Sartwell and fathered one son, George W. Sartwell, who died in 1863. He died in Fort Ann, Washington County, New York on 26 February 1910 and was buried in Fish Hill Cemetery in Fort Ann.

Military service 
Sartwell enlisted in the Army as a private on 28 July 1862 at Fort Ann. He was mustered in to Company D of the 123rd New York Infantry on 14 August 1862. He was promoted to sergeant on 4 September 1862. On 3 May 1863, at the Battle of Chancellorsville, Sartwell was shot in the left arm. After leaving the field for a short time he returned and fought with his unit until eventually being forced to retire because of blood loss. Sartwell was again wounded in a skirmish near Kennesaw Mountain, Georgia and was admitted to a hospital in Albany, New York. He was discharged from the Army on 27 May 1865.

Sartwell's Medal of Honor citation reads:

References 

1837 births
1910 deaths